Roch Lanctôt (January 30, 1866 – May 30, 1929) was a Canadian politician.

Born in Saint-Constant, Canada East, Lanctôt was educated at the University of Ottawa. A farmer by occupation, he was first elected to the House of Commons of Canada for the electoral district of Laprairie—Napierville in the general elections of 1904. A Liberal, he was re-elected in 1908, 1911, 1917, 1921, 1925, and 1926. He died in office in 1929.

References
 
 The Canadian Parliament; biographical sketches and photo-engravures of the senators and members of the House of Commons of Canada. Being the tenth Parliament, elected November 3, 1904

1866 births
1929 deaths
Liberal Party of Canada MPs
Members of the House of Commons of Canada from Quebec
People from Montérégie
People from Saint-Constant, Quebec